Ethnikos Sidirokastro Football Club is a Greek football club, based in Sidirokastro, Serres.

The club was founded in 1928. They spent two seasons at the Greek Second Division in 1975 and 1977. In 2012, they promoted to Football League 2, returning to the professional championships after 45 years.

Honours

Domestic Titles and honours
 Total Titles: 12
 Third Division: 2
 1974, 1976
 Fourth Division: 1
 2012
 Serres Regional Cup: 9 
 1972, 1973, 1988, 1992, 1996, 1999, 2000, 2011, 2012

References

External links
Official website 

Football clubs in Central Macedonia
Association football clubs established in 1928
1928 establishments in Greece